Taylor Landing Provincial Park is a provincial park in British Columbia, Canada.

References

Peace River Regional District
Provincial parks of British Columbia